Lucien Storme (18 June 1916 – 10 April 1945) was a Belgian professional road bicycle racer. He won the 1938 Paris–Roubaix. In December 1942, he was taken prisoner by the Germans for smuggling. In 1945, at the end of the Second World War, he was accidentally shot by the Americans.

Major results

1938
Paris–Roubaix
1939
Tour de France:
Winner stage 6A
1940
Kortrijk

References

External links

Official Tour de France results for Lucien Storme

1916 births
1945 deaths
Cyclists from West Flanders
Belgian male cyclists
Belgian Tour de France stage winners
Accidental deaths in Germany
Deaths by firearm in Germany
Belgian civilians killed in World War II
People from Heuvelland
Firearm accident victims